Caddo Public Schools is a school district based in Shreveport, Louisiana, United States. The district serves all of Caddo Parish.

History 
In 1965, the board was sued by Shreveport pastor and civil rights leader E. Edward Jones and his wife, Leslie, to compel, successfully, the desegregation of Caddo Parish public schools.

Schools

Secondary schools

High schools
C.E. Byrd High School
Caddo Magnet High School
Captain Shreve High School
Green Oaks High School
Huntington High School
North Caddo High School (Vivian, Louisiana)
Northwood High School
Southwood High School
Woodlawn Leadership Academy
Booker T. Washington High School

Middle schools
Caddo Middle Career & Technology School (Formerly Hollywood Middle School)
Caddo Parish Middle Magnet School
Donnie Bickham Middle School
Fair Park Middle School (Formerly Fair Park High School. Opened Fall 2017 as Middle School)
Ridgewood Middle School 
Youree Drive Middle AP Magnet School

Elementary/Middle Schools
Broadmoor STEM Academy (K-8) (Broadmoor Middle Lab merged with Arthur Circle Elementary in 2020)
Herndon Magnet School (K-8)
Keithville Elementary/Middle School (PreK-8)
Turner Elementary/6th Grade Academy (PreK-6)
Oak Park Micro-Society/ School
J.S. Clark Elementary/6th Grade Academy (PreK-6)
North Caddo Elementary/Middle Magnet School (PreK-8) (Vivian Campus - Consolidated w/ Oil City Magnet in 2016)
Walnut Hill Elementary/Middle School (PreK-8)

Primary schools

Atkins Technology Elementary Technology School (PreK-5)
Blanchard Elementary School (PreK-5)
Caddo Heights Elementary School (PreK-5)
Cherokee Park Elementary School (PreK-5)
Claiborne Fundamental Elementary School (K-5)
Creswell Elementary School (PreK-5 & ESL Program)
Eden Gardens Fundamental Elementary School (K-5)
Eighty-First Street ECE
Fairfield Elementary Magnet School (K-5)
Forest Hill Elementary School (PreK-5)
Judson Fundamental Elementary School (K-5)
Midway Elementary Professional Development School (PreK-5)
Mooringsport Elementary School (PreK-5)
North Highlands Elementary School (K-5)
Northside Elementary School (PreK-5)
Pine Grove Elementary School (PreK-5)
Queensborough Elementary School (PreK-5)
Riverside Elementary School (PreK-5)
Shreve Island Elementary School (PreK-5) Year-Round Campus
Southern Hills Elementary School (PreK-5)
A. C. Steere Elementary School (PreK-5)
South Highlands Elementary/Magnet (K-5)
Summerfield Elementary School (PreK-5)
Summer Grove Elementary School (PreK-5)
Sunset Acres Elementary School (PreK-5)
University Elementary School (PreK-5)
Werner Park Elementary School (PreK-5)
Westwood Elementary School School (PreK-5)
E. B. Williams Stoner Hill Elementary School (PreK-5)

Unique schools
Caddo Career & Technology Center
AmiKids Alternative at Hillsdale 
Pathways in Education (Grades 7-12)
Rutherford House (Caddo Accelerated Remedial Effort)
Ombudsman at Academic Recovery and Career Discovery Center (Ingersoll)
Magnolia Charter School of Excellence

Current staff
Dr. T. Lamar Goree, Superintendent of Schools
Mr. Keith Burton, Chief Academic Officer
Mrs. Leisa Edwards Woolfolk, Chief Human Resource Officer

See also

 List of school districts in Louisiana 
 District 1-5A
 Ollie Tyler, former superintendent and Shreveport mayor
 Billy Guin, one of the first three Republican members of the Caddo Parish School Board, with service from 1964 to 1970

References

External links
Caddo Public Schools
Caddo Public Schools--list of all schools

School districts in Louisiana
Schools
Education in Caddo Parish, Louisiana
School districts established in 1907
1907 establishments in Louisiana